The German national rugby union team are a national sporting side of Germany, representing them at rugby union. They made their first Rugby World Cup appearance at the 1998 tournament in the Netherlands, and made their last appearance at the 2002 Rugby World Cup in Spain. They regularly compete in the Rugby Europe Women's Championship.

History
The German women's national rugby union team was founded in 1989. Back then women's rugby was still part of the "Deutsche Rugby Jugend", the youth rugby organization in Germany. After only 2 training camps in Wiedenbrück and Hannover a team was formed with players from BSV 92 Berlin, DRC Hannover, RK Heusenstamm, SC Neuenheim, TV Wiedenbrück and SV 08 Ricklingen. For their first international match the German women met Sweden in Berlin in 1989 and lost only 0–8, and went on to qualify for the next two World Cups.

However German national teams (fifteens and sevens) have suffered from limited financial support, and after the European Championship finals in April 2005 (where Germany finished fourth) the DRV officially disbanded the XVs national team for financial reasons. Though this was reversed a year later at the next General Assembly of the DRV, it was a set-back and Germany have struggled to keep up with their neighbours in this form of the game.

Having played their last test match in 2010, Germany returned to test rugby in 2016 after a long six year absence. In 2019 Germany withdrew from the European Championships due to financial difficulties.

Records

Rugby World Cup

Overall 

(Full internationals only)

Players

Previous squads

See also
 Rugby union in Germany
 German women's rugby (in German)

References

External links
 Deutsche Rugby Frauen - Official Site
 German women's sevens academy  - Official 7s Site

European national women's rugby union teams
Rugby union in Germany
Rugby union